Meliadi is a village and a part of the community of Lagorrachi. Before the 2011 local government reform it was part of the municipality of Elafina. The 2011 census recorded 103 inhabitants in the village.

See also
Elafina
Lagorrachi
Moschopotamos
List of settlements in the Pieria regional unit

References

Populated places in Pieria (regional unit)